The 2015 NASCAR Whelen Euro Series  was the seventh Racecar Euro Series season, and the third under the NASCAR Whelen Euro Series branding.

The Elite 1 championship was won for the third time in four years by Ander Vilariño in the No. 2 TFT Racing Chevrolet Camaro. He scored three victories during the season, and ultimately won the championship by 35 points ahead of CAAL Racing driver Alon Day, who also took three victories – coming at the final two meetings of the season, at Magione and Zolder – during his first season in the championship. Third place, 13 points further in arrears, was Vilariño's team-mate Romain Iannetta, who won a race at Brands Hatch. Three other drivers won races during the season; Nicolò Rocca was another three-time winner for CAAL Racing, but he finished down in ninth in the drivers' championship, while Eddie Cheever III and defending champion Anthony Kumpen won a race apiece at Valencia and Venray respectively. Rocca won the Race And Win Pole Award for scoring the highest number of pole positions with four; the other two poles went to Day.

The Elite 2 championship was won by Gianmarco Ercoli, who won four races driving his No. 9 Double T by MRT Nocentini Chevrolet Camaro. Ercoli won the championship by 20 points ahead of Philipp Lietz, who won both races at Venray for GDL Racing. Third place in the championship – four points behind Lietz – went to Knauf Racing Team's Thomas Ferrando, who achieved three victories during 2015. The season's other race-winners finished fourth, fifth and sixth in the championship; Stienes Longin won at Tours Speedway for PK Carsport, Salvador Tineo Arroyo won at Magione for CAAL Racing and Dexwet Renauer Team's Florian Renauer was a race-winner at Brands Hatch.

Teams and drivers

Elite 1 Division

Elite 2 Division

Schedule and results
The schedule was announced in September 2014.

Elite 1

Elite 2

Championship standings

At the final two meetings of the season, double points were awarded in each race.

Elite 1
(key) Bold - Pole position awarded by time. Italics - Fastest lap. * – Most laps led.

Elite 2
(key) Bold - Pole position awarded by time. Italics - Fastest lap. * – Most laps led.

See also

 2015 NASCAR Sprint Cup Series
 2015 NASCAR Xfinity Series
 2015 NASCAR Camping World Truck Series
 2015 NASCAR K&N Pro Series East
 2015 NASCAR K&N Pro Series West
 2015 NASCAR Whelen Modified Tour
 2015 NASCAR Whelen Southern Modified Tour
 2015 NASCAR Canadian Tire Series
 2015 NASCAR Mexico Series

Notes

References

External links
 

NASCAR Whelen Euro Series seasons
NASCAR Whelen Euro Series